Lelei may refer to:

Lelei, village in Hodod
Lelei Fonoimoana (born 1958), American swimmer
Amanaki Lelei Mafi (born 1990), Tongan rugby player
David Lelei (1971–2010), Kenyan middle-distance runner
Sammy Lelei (born 1964), Kenyan marathon runner

Kenyan names